I carabbimatti is a 1981 Italian comedy film directed by Giuliano Carnimeo and starring Andy Luotto.

Plot

Cast 

 Andy Luotto – matto paranoico
 Giorgio Ariani – primario di Villa Verde
 Daniele Formica – Carabiniere Ceci
 Licinia Lentini – amante di Marrone
Enzo Robutti – matto
 Enzo Liberti – infermiere
 Paolo Baroni – matto 
 Lucio Montanaro – matto
 Guerrino Crivello – L'Elefantiere
 Angelo Pellegrino – maresciallo
 Ria De Simone – Maria Adele
 Giorgio Bracardi – matto nostalgico
 Leo Gullotta – Carabiniere Pasta 
 Gianni Agus – commendator Marrone

See also
 List of Italian films of 1981

References

External links

I carabbimatti at Variety Distribution

Films directed by Giuliano Carnimeo
Films scored by Berto Pisano
Italian comedy films
1981 comedy films
1981 films
1980s Italian-language films
1980s Italian films